Jakub Navrátil (born 1 February 1984) is a Czech footballer who plays as a central defender for Táborsko.

He signed for Sivasspor on a -year contract from FC Viktoria Plzeň in 2011.

Honours

Club

 FC Viktoria Plzeň
 Czech Cup: 2010

References

External links
 Profile at iDNES.cz

1984 births
Living people
Czech footballers
Association football defenders
Czech expatriate footballers
FC Viktoria Plzeň players
Sivasspor footballers
FK Mladá Boleslav players
Czech First League players
Süper Lig players
Expatriate footballers in Turkey
Czech expatriate sportspeople in Turkey
People from Tábor
Sportspeople from the South Bohemian Region